Adrapsa ablualis is a species of moth in the family Noctuidae that can be found in Queensland in Australia and in Southeast Asia. It was first described by Francis Walker in 1859.

Description
The wingspan of the male is 32 mm and the female is 36 mm. Male with a tuft of long hair from the base of second joint of palpi. Antennae of male with uniseriate pectinations. Antemedial and postmedial lines of forewings and sinuous submarginal line are white, where the first two are straighter. There is a white speck found at center and spot at end of cell. Hindwings with white base. Ventral side with basal area of both wings speckled with white.

References

Herminiinae
Moths described in 1859
Moths of Asia
Moths of Australia